The Mianus River Bridge is a span that carries Interstate 95 (Connecticut Turnpike) over the Mianus River, between Cos Cob and Riverside, Connecticut. It is the second bridge on the site. The original bridge collapsed in 1983, killing three motorists. The replacement span is officially named the Michael L. Morano Bridge, after a state senator Michael L. Morano who represented Greenwich.

Collapse
The bridge had a 100-foot (30.5 m) section of its deck of its northbound span collapse at 1:30 AM EST on Tuesday, June 28, 1983. Three people were killed and three more were seriously injured when two cars and two tractor-trailers fell with the bridge into the Mianus River 70 feet (21.3 m) below. A Connecticut state trooper was the first to arrive at the scene sometime before 2 AM. The towns marine police as well as the Coast Guard was called while Greenwich Police blocked off the highway as National Guard came in with helicopters. An unnamed man, traveling to Alabama that night, stopped upon spotting the crash and brought the other cars to a stop, likely preventing more falls. Many residents were also woken up due to the sound of the collapse, which shook houses and was ″like a clap of thunder″.

Casualties from the collapse were few because the disaster occurred at 1:30 a.m., when traffic was low on the often-crowded highway.

Causes
The collapse was caused by the failure of two pin and hanger assemblies that held the deck in place on the outer side of the bridge, according to an investigation by the National Transportation Safety Board. Rust formed within the bearing of the pin, exerting a force on the hanger which was beyond design limits for the retaining clamps. It forced the hanger on the inside part of the expansion joint at the southeast corner off the end of the pin that was holding it, and the load was shifted to outside hanger. The extra load on the remaining hanger started a fatigue crack at a sharp corner on the pin. When it failed catastrophically, the deck was supported at just three corners. When two heavy trucks and a car entered the section, the remaining expansion joint failed, and the deck crashed into the river below.

The ensuing NTSB investigation concluded that the collapse occurred due to ″deficiencies in the State of Connecticut’s bridge safety inspection and bridge maintenance program.″ They cited corrosion from water buildup due to inadequate drainage as a cause. During road mending some 10 years before, the highway drains had been deliberately blocked and the crew failed to unblock them when the road work was completed. Rainwater leaked down through the pin bearings, causing them to rust. The outer bearings were fracture-critical and non-redundant, a design flaw of this particular type of structure. The bearings were difficult to inspect close-up, although traces of rust could be seen near the affected bearings.

The incident was also blamed on inadequate inspection resources in the state of Connecticut. At the time of the disaster, the state had just 12 engineers, working in pairs, assigned to inspect 3,425 bridges. The collapse came despite the nationwide inspection procedures brought about by the collapse of the Silver Bridge in West Virginia in December 1967. The collapse also came as a surprise, considering the bridge underwent a DOT inspection just 9 months prior. After the collapse, one of the inspectors altered his notes to add 20 additional notes to appear as if he had observed the problems with the bridge. He made the additional notes with a finer pencil, and thus he was found out and due to his long record of service, given one year probation.  Also, on the weekend leading up to the collapse, residents had complained about an increase in strange noises and vibrations coming from the bridge, included what one residents described as ″like thousands of birds chirping″, but no action was taken.

Aftermath
After the collapse, the almost 90,000 vehicles that used the bridge daily were diverted onto US-1 and local streets in Greenwich, causing the worst traffic problems the town had ever seen. The Town of Greenwich Health Department monitored the environmental impact, providing advice through the issuance of special bulletins to residents along the temporary routes. After temporary repairs, the bridge was reopened to light traffic, and only cars were allowed. The interstate was not fully reopened until September, and then only with a temporary truss. In total, final repairs cost over $20 million. The Mianus River Bridge was completely reconstructed in the late 1980s. Work included replacing all of the structural steel, rebuilding and expanding the bridge deck to accommodate a wider roadway, and repairing the bridge piers to extend their service life. The replacement span was completed in 1992. It eliminated the pin-and-hanger assemblies that caused the collapse of the original bridge. Many other bridges were also retrofitted after the collapse to prevent what happened to cause the bridge to collapse.

Governor William O'Neill afterward proposed a $5.5 billion transportation spending package to pay for rehabilitation and replacement of bridges and other transportation projects in Connecticut.

In 1992, the bridge was officially named the Michael L. Morano Bridge, after a state senator who represented nearby Greenwich.

See also
 
 
 
 List of bridge failures

References

External links
NTSB report on the collapse (PDF).
A history of the Connecticut Turnpike (I-95) at NYC Roads.com.
 - Archival news footage of the disaster via YouTube.
28 June 1983 on Connecticut History website.

Bridge disasters in the United States
Bridge disasters caused by maintenance error
Buildings and structures in Greenwich, Connecticut
Bridges completed in 1958
1958 establishments in Connecticut
Disasters in Connecticut
Transportation disasters in Connecticut
1983 disasters in the United States
Bridges in Fairfield County, Connecticut
Road bridges in Connecticut
Interstate 95
Bridges on the Interstate Highway System
Former toll bridges in Connecticut
Girder bridges in the United States